Pasir Panjang Pillbox is a strengthened-concrete defensive structure from WWII, located in Pasir Panjang in the southwestern area of Singapore.

Background and history
In advance of the Japanese invasion of Malaya and Singapore between 1941 and 1942 during World War II, a number of concrete-built defensive pillboxes were built along Singapore's eastern and western coasts.

Gallery

References

Coastal fortifications
Forts in Singapore
Military of Singapore under British rule
World War II sites in Singapore
Pillboxes (military)